T-74 may refer to:

 Type 74, a Japanese main battle tank
 Object 450, an unrealized Soviet tank designed by Alexander Alexandrovich Morozov